Lohann Doucet (born 14 September 2002) is a French professional footballer who plays as a defensive midfielder for the French club Nantes.

Career
Doucet is a youth product of Elan Sorinières and LLOSC before joining the youth academy of Nantes in 2012. He signed his first professional contract with Nantes on 8 December 2021. He made his professional debut with Nantes in a 1–1 Ligue 1 tie with Brest on 10 April 2022, coming on as a late sub in the 92nd minute.

Personal life
Born in France, Doucet is of Burkinabé descent.

References

External links
 
 
 

2002 births
Living people
French sportspeople of Burkinabé descent
Footballers from Loire-Atlantique
French footballers
Association football midfielders
FC Nantes players
Ligue 1 players
Championnat National 2 players